The 1965 U.S. Figure Skating Championships was held at the (1932) Olympic Arena in Lake Placid, New York, from February 10 to 13, 1965. Medals were awarded in three colors: gold (first), silver (second), and bronze (third) in four disciplines – men's singles, ladies' singles, pair skating, and ice dancing – across three levels: senior, junior, and novice.

The event determined the U.S. team for the 1965 World Championships.

Senior results

Men
Gary Visconti defeated defending champion Scott Allen, winning both the compulsory figures and free skating. Visconti skated a clean free skating with double jumps while Allen, although landing a triple salchow, fell on a triple loop and made other mistakes. Tim Wood was third in both figures and free skating, where he landed a good triple salchow.

Ladies
Peggy Fleming retained her title. She had placed second to Christine Haigler in the compulsory figures, but Haigler fell three times in her free skating, while Fleming skated a clean program with superior connecting moves as well as clean double axel and double lutz jumps. Tina Noyes also skated a strong program with a double axel and several double jump combinations to take the bronze medal.

Pairs
1964 champions had retired. The new champions were Vivian Joseph / Ronald Joseph. Both they and the second-place team Cynthia Kauffman / Ronald Kauffman performed unusual pair spin variations in their free skating.

Ice dancing (Gold dance)
1964 champions had retired. Kristin Fortune / Dennis Sveum were the new champions.

Junior results

Men

Ladies

Pairs

Ice dancing (Silver dance)

* Eliminated before final round

Novice results

Men

Ladies

Sources
 "Quality Hits New High", Skating magazine, April 1965

U.S. Figure Skating Championships
United States Figure Skating Championships, 1965
United States Figure Skating Championships, 1965
United States Figure Skating Championships
U.S. Figure Skating Championships